Gabriel III may refer to:

 Pope Gabriel III of Alexandria, ruled in 1268–1271
 Gabriel III of Constantinople, Ecumenical Patriarch in 1702–1707